The 24th Central American and Caribbean Games are scheduled to take place in 2023. They were planned to take place in Panama City, Panama, until the government announced on 24 July 2020 that it had decided to withdraw as the hosts as a result of the COVID-19 pandemic in Panama.  Centro Caribe Sports had search for alternatives. In May 2021 San Salvador, El Salvador was chosen to replace Panama City as main host city, as due to infrastructure and schedule issues 7 sports were relocated to Santo Domingo, in Dominican Republic.

Bidding process
Panama City had presented itself as the only candidate to organize the 2022 Central American and Caribbean Games and also announced the commitment of the Panamanian State to invest 200 million dollars for both infrastructure and the organization of the event. One of the advantages presented by the Panamanian delegation to Centro Caribe Sports was that it would not be necessary to build an athletes' village for the event, because instead the athletes would be hosted in hotels. On February 3, 2017, Centro Caribe Sports announced that Panama City would host the event. It would have been the third time: Panama City first hosted the Central American and Caribbean Games in 1938 and then in 1970.

On 24 July 2020, Panama announced that it was withdrawing as the host of the 2022 event as a result of the COVID-19 pandemic. Centro Caribe Sports expressed its surprise at the sudden withdrawal and assured that the event will still take place in 2022. It said the executive committee would meet on 25 July 2020 to discuss the issue and begin a search for solutions and alternatives.

On November 15, 2020 Mayagüez, Puerto Rico presented a bid to host the games conditioned that it receive financial support from the Financial Oversight and Management Board for Puerto Rico.  Mayagüez previously held the games on 2010, and thus would not have to invest as much on infrastructure since it would reuse most of the facilities.

Participating countries
The following nations are expected to participate:

Games

Sports
The following competitions are scheduled to place:

Venues 
Due to infrastructure and calendar issues 7 sports were relocated to Santo Domingo in Dominican Republic: taekwondo, modern pentathlon, equestrian, canoeing, shooting, racquetball and field hockey.

Marketing 
The official emblem and motto for the 2023 Central American and Caribbean Games was unveiled on 23 January 2023 at the former Casa Presidencial in San Jacinto, it takes the form of a circle in an colored star pattern. The design was meant to "express the constant movement, evolution and transformation process that El Salvador is experiencing". The stars "represent guided humanity since its origins and have become a symbol that represents harmony, prosperity and glory". The official slogan Es momento de trascender was also unveiled on 23 January 2023. The slogan will be solely used in Spanish.

See also
Previous Central American and Caribbean Games in El Salvador
1935 Central American and Caribbean Games – San Salvador
2002 Central American and Caribbean Games – San Salvador

References

External links

Central American and Caribbean Games
Central American and Caribbean Games
Central American and Caribbean Games
Central American and Caribbean Games
Central American and Caribbean Games 2022
Central American and Caribbean Games 2022
Central American and Caribbean Games
Central American and Caribbean Games